Malon may refer to:

Arts and entertainment
 Malón (band), an Argentinian thrash metal band
 Malon (Star Trek), a fictional alien race 
 Malon, a character in The Legend of Zelda

People
 Benoît Malon (1841–1893), a French socialist political leader
 František Maloň (1913–?), a Czech rower
 Iván Malón (born 1986), a Spanish footballer

Places
 Malon, Burkina Faso
 Malon, Homalin, Burma
 Malon, Zaragoza, Spain

Other uses
Malón, plunder raids carried out by Mapuche warriors

See also

Malol language